David Huber may refer to:

 David L. Huber, United States Attorney for the Western District of Kentucky
 David Lee Huber, perpetrator of the 2021 Sunrise, Florida shootout
 David Miles Huber, American composer and producer
 David R. Huber, American engineer